The Philippine Masters is a professional golf tournament in the Philippines. First played as the Philippine Masters Invitational in 1976 over the golf course at Nichols Air Base (now Villamor Air Base) in Pasay, to the south of Manila, it was scheduled the week before the first event of the Asia Golf Circuit calendar, and as such was considered an unofficial season opener or warm-up event for the tour.

In the late 1990s, it became a full event on the Asia Golf Circuit but when the tour ended, the Philippine Masters soon followed. After 2000, it was not staged again until it was revived in 2017 as an event on the local Philippine Golf Tour.

Winners

Notes

References 

Golf tournaments in the Philippines
Asia Golf Circuit events
Recurring sporting events established in 1976
Sport in Pasay